Bailando por un Sueño 3 was the third Argentine season of Bailando por un Sueño. The first show of the  season aired on October 2, 2006 and was part of the original show broadcast as Showmatch  on Canal 13 and hosted by Marcelo Tinelli, as well as the previous season that had finished a month before. This time, there were 15 couples competing, and the competition lasted 12 weeks. The winner was revealed on the season finale, on December 21, 2006: model, TV host and actress Carla Conte, who was paired with the professional dancer, Guillermo Conforte.

In this third season, the panel of judges was headed until November 23, 2006 by entrepreneur and TV producer/host Gerardo Sofovich, alongside journalist Jorge Lafauci, actress and dancer Moria Casán, and actress and dancer Reina Reech. On Tuesday, November 21, Mr. Sofovich announced that he would be resigning as president of the panel of judges on account of what he felt were “some participants’ insolence and lack of respect for the judges”, and his vexation at the quarrels that had involved him (first with celebrity Laura Fidalgo, with whom he had already had an altercation before the contest, then with Javier Rojas, and lastly with the recently evicted Eduardo Garro). Although the show's host and producer (and Mr. Sofovich's personal friend) Marcelo Tinelli entreated with him to stay, it was announced that his replacements would rotate weekly for the remainder of the show. For the week of November 27, former football star Diego Maradona (who had competed in the Italian Ballando con le Stelle in 2005) took over Sofovich's seat in the panel of judges. He was replaced the following week by Florencia de la V, winner of the second season of the show for the rest of the show's run,  but Moria Casán took over. Samuel Gelblung presided over the semifinals, but Sofovich came back in the season finale to crown the winner.

Couples

Scoring chart 

1 Couples in the bottom two, but in this week there was elimination.

Red numbers indicate the lowest score for each week.
Green numbers indicate the highest score for each week.
 indicates the couple eliminated that week.
 indicates the couple was saved by the public.
 indicates the winning couple.
 indicates the runner-up couple.
 indicates the semifinalists couples.

Highest and lowest scoring performances 
The best and worst performances in each dance according to the judges' marks are as follows:

Styles, scores and songs

Week 1: Disco 

Running order

Week 2 

      Sentenced: 
      Saved by the public: 
      Eliminated:

Week 3 

      Sentenced: 
      Saved by the public: 
      Eliminated:

Week 4 

      Sentenced: 
      Saved by the public: 
      Eliminated:

Week 5 

      Sentenced: 
      Saved by the public: 
      Eliminated:

Week 6 

      Sentenced: 
      Saved by the public: 
      Eliminated:

Week 7 

      Sentenced: 
      Saved by the public: 
      Eliminated:

Week 8 

      Sentenced: 
      Saved by the public: 
      Eliminated:

Week 9 

      Sentenced: 
      Saved by the public: 
      Eliminated:

Week 10 

      Sentenced: 
      Saved by the public: 
      Eliminated:

Week 11 

      Sentenced: 
      Saved by the public: 
      Eliminated:

Week 12

Semifinal and Final

Argentina
Argentine variety television shows
2006 Argentine television seasons